Qaderlu (also Romanized as Qāderlū; also known as Kadirlu and Qādirlu) is a village in Ijrud-e Pain Rural District, Halab District, Ijrud County, Zanjan Province, Iran. At the 2006 census, its population was 24, in 5 families.

References 

Populated places in Ijrud County